Ricardo Bofill Leví (5 December 1939 – 14 January 2022) was a Spanish architect from Catalonia. He founded Ricardo Bofill Taller de Arquitectura in 1963 and developed it into a leading international architectural and urban design practice. According to architectural historian Andrew Ayers, his creations rank "among the most impressive buildings of the 20th century."

Early life and education
Born in late 1939, just after the end of the Spanish Civil War, Ricardo Bofill grew up in a well-to-do family with deep Catalan and Barcelonese roots. Ricardo Bofill would later describe him as "republican, liberal, progressive, austere and logical." Ricardo's mother, Maria Levi (1909-1991), was an Italian of Jewish descent born in Venice, who became a prominent sponsor of Catalan literature and culture in post-war Barcelona.

He spent much of his youth traveling, first with his family and later on his own, and developed a passion for vernacular architecture. His first architecture design was a summer home in Ibiza, completed in 1960. In 1961-1962 he went into Spanish military service for nine months. He was again arrested and briefly incarcerated on political grounds in Barcelona in 1964.

Taller de Arquitectura

In 1963, Bofill and a group of close friends created Ricardo Bofill Taller de Arquitectura (Ricardo Bofill Architecture Workshop), initially hosted in his father's construction business with offices on Plaça de Catalunya in the center of Barcelona. Building on Catalan traditions of craftsmanship, he enlisted architects and engineers but also writers and artists into a multidisciplinary effort, which later branched into urban design and urban planning. The same thinking was developed on a larger scale with the project La Ciudad en el Espacio ("The City in Space"), whose construction started in the Moratalaz area of Madrid in 1970 but was abruptly stopped by Francoist mayor Carlos Arias Navarro. It was instead realized with the construction of Walden 7 in Sant Just Desvern near Barcelona (1970-1975). These projects were recognized as exemplars of critical regionalism and can be viewed as a reaction against both architectural modernism and the Francoist dictatorship in Spain.

Bofill then started working in France, and gradually introduced symbolic elements into the Taller'''s designs that echo French traditions of classical architecture. This morphed into a project named La Petite Cathédrale ("the small cathedral") but actually intended as a large-scale development, which was approved in 1973 but canceled in 1974. Another major development was a competition-winning concept for Les Halles in Paris in 1975, whose construction subsequently started but was reversed in 1978 by the newly elected mayor Jacques Chirac. Other projects did come to fruition in the  around Paris which offered a favorable environment for large-scale experimentation, including Les Espaces d'Abraxas in Marne-la-Vallée and Les Arcades du Lac in Saint-Quentin-en-Yvelines. This phase culminated in the expansive Antigone new district of Montpellier in Southern France, for which Bofill presented the initial master plan in 1978. It is associated with both large-scale industrialization in precast concrete and classical forms and geometries in contemporary architecture, which Bofill called "modern classicism". As a consequence, Bofill opus is often cited as that one of the most representative and signififant postmodern architects to have lived and created in Europe.

From the mid-1980s on, he increasingly shifted to glass and steel for the materials used in his projects, while still using a classical vocabulary of columns and pediments. Representative projects of that period include the 77 West Wacker Drive office tower in Chicago, the extension of Barcelona Airport ahead of the 1992 Summer Olympics, and the National Theater of Catalonia, also in Barcelona.

In 2000, Bofill re-centralized the activities of the Taller at its head office near Barcelona. His designs in more recent years gradually shed his classical decorative vocabulary of the 1980s and 1990s, while retaining a highly formal sense of geometry. Representative buildings of this more recent period include the W Barcelona Hotel on the Barcelona seafront and the Mohammed VI Polytechnic University in Ben Guerir, Morocco.

Personal life and death

Bofill met Italian actress Serena Vergano in 1962;; their son Ricardo Emilio Bofill was born in 1965. Bofill and French visual artist Annabelle d'Huart had another son, Pablo Bofill, born in 1980. Both sons eventually worked with their father at Ricardo Bofill Taller de Arquitectura, and are co-leading the firm as of January 2022. From the 1990s, Bofill lived in Barcelona together with Catalan designer Marta de Vilallonga. In October 2021, he was named in the Pandora Papers.

Selected works

Urban design
 Large-scale master plans for Boston Central Artery (1987), Kobe waterfront (1991), Nansha District in Guangdong (1992), Barcelona Diagonal Mar (1992), Paseo de la Castellana extension in Madrid (1996/1999), Trinity Riverfront in Dallas (2013), Greater Moscow (2013)
 Antigone district in Montpellier, developed from 1979 with many buildings also designed by Bofill and his Taller Master plan for the redevelopment of the Kirchberg district in Luxembourg City (1998), including the creation of the urban square Place de l'Europe and the twin towers of La Porte designed by the Taller Urban neighborhoods in Reus (1970), Marne-la-Vallée (Les Espaces d'Abraxas, 1982), Saint-Quentin-en-Yvelines (Les Arcades du Lac, 1982), Cergy-Pontoise (Le Belvédère Saint-Christophe, 1985), Stockholm (På Söder Crescent, 1992), The Hague (2004)
 Mohammed VI Polytechnic University campus in Ben Guerir, Morocco (2011/2016)

Buildings
 La Fábrica, headquarters of Ricardo Bofill Taller de Arquitectura and residence for Bofill and his family (1975)
 Early housing complexes in Spain based on geometrical pattern combinations: El Castillo de Kafka (1968), Xanadu (1971), La Muralla Roja (1973), Walden 7 (1975)
 Les Échelles du Baroque apartment building in Paris (1985)
 77 West Wacker Drive office tower in Chicago (1992)
 Madrid Congress Center (1993)
 National Theater of Catalonia in Barcelona (1997)
 Casablanca Twin Center in Casablanca, Morocco (1999)
  in Valladolid, Spain (2007)
 W Hotel on the Barcelona waterfront (2009)
 Terminal 2 (1992) and Terminal 1 (2009) of Josep Tarradellas Barcelona–El Prat Airport

Writing
 Ricardo Bofill, Hacia una Formalización de la Ciudad en el Espacio, Barcelona: Blume Editorial, 1968
 Ricardo Bofill,, L’Architecture d’un Homme (with François Hébert-Stevens), Paris: Arthaud, 1978
 Ricardo Bofill and Jean-Louis André, Espaces d’une vie, Paris: Odile Jacob, 1989 (Translated into Spanish as Espacio y Vida, 1990, and in Italian as Spazi di una vita, 1996)
 Ricardo Bofill and Nicolas Véron, L’Architecture des villes, Paris: Odile Jacob, 1995

Filming
 Circles, 1966. Color, 35 mm, 17 minutes. Directed by Ricardo Bofill and Carles Durán. Actors: Serena Vergano, Salvador Clotas. Phography: Juan Amorós. Presented at Festival de Tours, France, 1968
 Schizo, 1969-1970. Color, 35 mm, 60 minutes. Directed by Ricardo Bofill, Carles Durán and Manolo Núñez Yanosvski. Actors: Serena Vergano, Modesto Bertrán. Phography: Juan Amorós. Choreography: Antonio Miralles. Presented at 48 Mostra Cinematografica Internazionale di Venezia, Sala Volpi, 1991.

Recognition
In a noted study of France's evolving social structures and landscapes published in 2021, political scientist Jérôme Fourquet and journalist Jean-Laurent Cassely wrote that "the monumental projects designed by Spanish architect Ricardo-Bofill in Noisy-le-Grand (Les Espaces d'Abraxas), in Saint-Quentin-en-Yvelines (Les Arcades du Lac) and in Montpellier (the Antigone neighborhood) are basically the architectural signature of the 1980s" in the country.

Exhibitions

Bofill and his Taller de Arquitectura were featured in three exhibitions of the Museum of Modern Art in New York City: "Transformations in Modern Architecture" (1979), "Ricardo Bofill and Leon Krier: Architecture, Urbanism, and History" (1985), and "Architecture & Design Drawings: Rotation 3" (2006). They were also featured at the Venice Biennale in 1980, 1982, and 1992.

Degrees and awards
 1968: Fritz Schumacher Honoris Causa Degree, University of Hamburg
 1978: American Society of Interior Designers, International Prize
 1979: Architecte Agréé, 
 1980: Prize of Architecture of the City of Barcelona, for the renovation of the cement factory in Sant Just Desvern
 1985: Honorary Fellow, American Institute of Architects
 1989: Ordre des Architectes Conseils du Brabant, Belgium
 1989: Chicago Architecture Award, Illinois Council / American Institute of Architects / Architectural Record
 1989: Académie Internationale de Philosophie de l´Art, Bern, Switzerland
 1995: Doctor Honoris Causa, Metz University
 1996: Honorary Fellow of the Association of German Architects
 2009: Life Time Achievement Award, Israeli Building Center
 2009: Vittorio de Sica Architecture Prize, Quirinal, Rome
 2021: Doctor Honoris Causa, Polytechnic University of Catalonia

Honors
 1984: Officer of l'Ordre des Arts et des Lettres, France
 1993: Creu de Sant Jordi, Catalonia

Gallery

See also
 Vittorio Gregotti
 Léon Krier
 Aldo Rossi
 Moshe Safdie
 New Urbanism
 New Classical architecture

References

Notes

Books about Bofill and his work
 José Agustín Goytisolo, Taller de Arquitectura : poemas. Barcelona: Blume, 1976
 Ricardo Bofill, Projets Français 1978-1981. Paris: L’Equerre, 1981
 Annabelle D’Huart, Ricardo Bofill, Los Espacios de Abraxas, El Palacio, El Teatro, El Arco. Paris: L’Equerre, 1981
 “Ricardo Bofill Taller de Arquitectura”. Global Architecture No.4, New York: Rizzoli International, 1985
 "The City: Classicism and Technology". Max Protetch Gallery. Artforum 4, 1986
 Ricardo Bofill Taller de Arquitectura: Edificios y proyectos 1960-1984. Barcelona: Gustavo Gili, 1988
 Warren A. James, Ricardo Bofill Taller de Arquitectura: Buildings and Projects 1960-1984. New York: Rizzoli, 1988
 Annabelle D’Huart, Ricardo Bofill. Paris: Editions du Moniteur, 1989
 Ricardo Bofill. Barcelona Airport. Milan: Edizioni Tecno, 1991
 Jean-Louis André and Patrick Genard, Swift, Architecture & Technologie. Taller Design, 1991
 Bartomeu Cruells, Ricardo Bofill: Obras y Proyectos. Barcelona: Gustavo Gili 1992
 Memory-Future. Barcelona: Taller de Arquitectura, 1993
 Bartomeu Cruells, Ricardo Bofill Taller de Arquitectura''. Bologna: Zanichelli Editore, 1994

External links

 Ricardo Bofill Taller de Arquitectura's Website
 Photos of selected works of Ricardo Bofill
 Ricardo Bofill feature in some/things

1939 births
2022 deaths
Postmodern architects
Spanish people of Jewish descent
Spanish people of Italian descent
Architects from Catalonia
Urban planners from Catalonia
People named in the Pandora Papers
Deaths from the COVID-19 pandemic in Spain